Elkfork (also Elk Fork) is an unincorporated community in Morgan County, Kentucky, United States. It lies along Route 172, northeast of the city of West Liberty, the county seat of Morgan County.  Its elevation reaches up to 856 feet (261 m). Although the area is unincorporated, Elkfork contains a post office, with the ZIP code of 41421.

References

Unincorporated communities in Morgan County, Kentucky
Unincorporated communities in Kentucky